Sabarimala is a hill situated in Perinad village, Ranni Taluk, Pathanamthitta district in Kerala State. This hill is situated at 72 kilometers from Pathanamthitta town. The distance from Ranni to Sabarimala is 60 kilometers. A motorable road is built from Ranni to Pampa, valley of Sabarimala hills. Sabarimala Sree Dharmasastha Temple, Malikappuram Temple are situated in one side of this hills. Sabarimala is a part of periyar tiger reserve and Western ghats. The height of Sabarimala from mean sea level is 1,260 meters.

Gallery

View of Hills

Flora of Sabarimala hills

References 

Coordinates on Wikidata
Hills of Kerala
Pages with unreviewed translations
Sabarimala